Westhues is a surname. Notable people with the surname include:

Alfons Lütke-Westhues (1930–2004), German equestrian
August Lütke-Westhues (1926–2000), German equestrian
Jonathan Westhues, American software engineer
Kenneth Westhues, Canadian sociologist
Mike Westhues (1949–2013), American-born Finnish singer-songwriter and guitarist